Long Hole, also spelled Longhole, is a limestone cave on the south coast of the Gower Peninsula between Paviland and Port Eynon. It was first excavated in 1861 by Colonel E. R. Wood. Wood found evidence of a lithic assemblage and faunal remains. The faunal remains included cave hyena, reindeer, Woolly rhinoceros, mammoth, straight-tusked elephant and wild horse.

A second excavation was conducted in 1969 by J. B. Campbell. Analysis of the evidence from the two excavations, including sediment and pollen as well as the lithic evidence, has identified Long Hole as an Aurignacian site contemporary with and related to the site at Paviland, evidence of the first modern humans in Britain.

References 

Caves of Wales
Aurignacian
Limestone caves
Archaeological sites in Wales